The Vietnamese television mystery music game show Hidden Voices premiered the fourth season on HTV7 on 27 July 2019. This season has originally scheduled to air on television for 15 weeks, but it was then further extended to 26 weeks by releasing 11 additional episodes through video on demand.

Gameplay

Format
Under the battle format, both opponents can eliminate one singer each in the first two rounds, and then both can choose one singer each to join the final performance in the third round. At the end of the game, the conditions for mystery singers chosen by opposing guest artists depending on the outcome of a final performance, if:

Rewards
If one guest artist has a good singer, he/she wins ₫50,000,000. In case of a tie (as both opponents have good singers), the same amount becomes split in half, leaving with ₫25,000,000 each. Both winning singers, regardless of being good or bad, receive ₫10,000,000 each.

Rounds
Each episode presents the opposing guest artists with seven people whose identities and singing voices are kept concealed until they are eliminated to perform on the "stage of truth" or remain in the end to perform the final duet.

Episodes (2019)

Guest artists

Panelists

Episodes (2020)

Guest artists

Panelists

Notes

References

Hidden Voices (game show)
2019 Vietnamese television seasons
2020 Vietnamese television seasons